Tempur Sealy International, Inc. is an American manufacturer of mattresses and bedding products.  It was formed when Tempur-Pedic International, a manufacturer of memory foam mattresses acquired its biggest competitor Sealy Corporation in 2012. It is based in Lexington, Kentucky.

See also
Sleep hygiene
Memory foam
Unboxing
Foam rubber

References

External links
Tempur Sealy Official Website
Gotta Sleep Comfortable Mattress
Mattress Type By Sleeping Position

Companies based in Lexington, Kentucky
Companies listed on the New York Stock Exchange
Mattress retailers of the United States
American companies established in 2012